Rohan Sudhakar Adnaik (born 2 February 1992) is an Indian professional footballer who plays as a defender for DSK Shivajians in the I-League.

Career
Born in Kolhapur, Adnaik started his career representing Khandoba Talim Mandal, Kolhapur, in the Maharashtra Inter-District Under-19 Tournament. He then joined DSK Shivajians where he played in various tournaments for the club before they entered the I-League.

He made his professional debut with DSK Shivajians on 17 January 2016 in their first game of the season against Sporting Goa.

Career statistics

References

External links 
 DSK Shivajians Profile.

1992 births
Living people
People from Kolhapur
Indian footballers
DSK Shivajians FC players
Association football defenders
Footballers from Maharashtra
I-League players